The Auction Block is a 1926 American silent comedy film directed by Hobart Henley. The film stars Charles Ray and Eleanor Boardman. It is written by Fanny and Frederic Hatton and is based on the novel of the same name by Rex Beach. It is considered a lost film.

The film is a remake of the 1917 film of the same name, released by Goldwyn production starring Rubye De Remer and Tom Powers.

Plot
Bob Wharton (Charles Ray) marries beauty queen Lorelei Knight (Eleanor Boardman), only to fall into the arms of Bernice Lane (Sally O'Neil) during their honeymoon. Lorelei abandons him to return home, but the husband goes after her to win her back. The opportunity presents itself at a charity auction.

Cast
 Charles Ray as Bob Wharton 
 Eleanor Boardman as Lorelei Knight 
 Sally O'Neil as Bernice Lane 
 Donald Reed as Carter Lane (as Ernest Gillen) 
 Charles Clary as Homer Lane 
 David Torrence as Robert Wharton Sr 
 James Corrigan as Mr. Knight 
 Forrest Seabury as Edward Blake 
 Ned Sparks as Nat Saluson

References

External links

The Auction Block at the silentera.com database

1926 films
1926 comedy films
American black-and-white films
Silent American comedy films
American silent feature films
Films based on American novels
Films directed by Hobart Henley
Remakes of American films
Metro-Goldwyn-Mayer films
Lost American films
Films based on works by Rex Beach
1926 lost films
Lost comedy films
1920s American films